Mark Professionals was a football (soccer) club from Liberia based in Monrovia. Their home stadium was the Antonette Tubman Stadium. They never won the Liberian Premier League (LPL) or the Liberian Cup in their history. The club dissolved at the end of the 2007 season.

Achievements
Liberian Premier League: None
Liberian Cup: None

Football clubs in Liberia
Sport in Monrovia

References